A list of islands of Bothnian Bay would include 4,001 islands if an island is defined as an area of land more than  that is surrounded by water.

Bothnian Bay is divided between northern Sweden and Finland.
The north of the bay contains a large archipelago area.
The largest island is Hailuoto, further south on the Finnish side.
In the winter the larger islands may be accessed via ice roads. Some of them are inhabited or have seasonal fishing villages used by people from the mainland.

Swedish islands

The Swedish islands in the north of the bay may be grouped into the Piteå, Luleå, Kalix and Haparanda archipelagos.
Many of the islands are uninhabited and in a natural state.
There are other islands along the Swedish coast to the south of the  archipelago area.

Piteå

Some of the larger islands in the Piteå archipelago include:

 Baggen
 Bergön
 Buskön
 Fårön
 Jävre Sandön
 Jävreholmen
 Lill-Räbben
 Mellerstön
 Nörd-Mörön
 Piteå-Rönnskär
 Stenskäret
 Stor-Räbben
 Vargön

Luleå

Some of the larger islands in the Luleå archipelago include:

Altappen
Bastaskär 
Brändöskär
Estersön
Finnskär
Germanön
Hertsöland
Hindersön
Junkön
Kallaxön
Kluntarna
Likskär
Långön
Rödkallen
Rörbäck Sandöskatan
Sandgrönnorna
Sandön
Smålsön
Småskär
Stor-Brändön
Uddskär

Kalix

Some of the larger islands in the Kalix archipelago include:

 Bergön 
 Berghamn
 Björn 
 Getskär-Renskär 
 Granön
 Halsön 
 Likskär 
 Malören
 Rånön
 Stora Huvön 
 Stora Trutskär

Haparanda

The Swedish Haparanda Archipelago National Park lies within the Haparanda group of islands, bordering the Finnish Bothnian Bay National Park. It includes the larger islands of Sandskär and Seskar Furö, and some smaller islands and skerries. 
All of these islands have emerged in the last 1,500 years as the bed of the bay has risen.
Some of the larger islands in Haparanda archipelago include:

Hanhinkari	
Kataja
Sandskär
Seskar-Furö
Seskarö	
Skomakaren
Stora Hamnskär
Stora Hepokari
Torne-Furö

Other Swedish islands

 Bredskär
 Halsön
 Högskäret
 Malören
 Romelsön
 Selsvik
 Skötgrönnan

Finnish islands
In the portion of the bay that belongs to Finland the majority of islands lie in the section between Tornio on the Swedish border and the large island of Hailuoto offshore from Oulu, although there are many small islands along the coast to the south.
The Bothnian Bay National Park in the Finnish section, established in 1991, is located in the archipelago offshore from Tornio and Kemi.

Tornio municipality
Islands in the Tornio municipality beside the Swedish municipality of Haparanda include:

 Inakari
 Iso-Huituri (Tornio and Kemi)
 Kuusiluoto
 Pajukari
 Pensaskari
 Röyttä

Kemi municipality
Islands in the Kemi municipality to the east of Tornio, at the mouth of river Kemijoki, include:

 Ajos
 Inakari
 Keilakrunni
 Kemin Kiikkara
 Keminkraaseli
 Pohjois-Kraaseli
 Rautakallio
 Selkä-Sarvi
 Täikkö
 Täikönkari

Simo municipality
Islands in the Simo municipality at the mouth of river Simojoki include:

 Halttari
 Härkäletto
 Laitakari
 Leipäreet
 Lissabon
 Montaja
 Möyly
 Ööperit
 Paskaletto
 Pirttisaari
 Rajaletto
 Saapaskari
 Tiuranen
 Tiurasenkalla
 Tiurasenkrunni
 Tynttyrit
 Ykskivi

Ii municipality

Islands in the Ii municipality at the mouth of river Iijoki include:

 Hietakalla, Vatunki
 Hietakalla, Hiastinlahti
 Hylkikalla
 Iin Röyttä
 Illinsaari
 Karhu
 Koni
 Krassinletto
 Kriisi
 Krunnien saaristo
 Kuivamatala
 Kutinkalla
 Onsajanmatala
 Pallonen
 Pensaskari
 Ryöskärinkalla
 Santapankki
 Satakari
 Selkäletto
 Tangonsaari
 Ulko-Klaama
 Ulko-Pallonen
 Ulkokrunni

Haukipudas municipality

Islands in the former Haukipudas municipality include:

 Äijänkumpele
 Astekari
 Hanhikari
 Hietakari 
 Hiuvet
 Hopreeni
 Iso-Miehikkä
 Isonkivenletto
 Kaasamatala,
 Kattilankalla
 Kellon Kraaseli
 Kintasletto
 Kotakari
 Kriisinkivi
 Kropsu
 Laitakari
 Lemmonletto
 Luodeletto
 Länsiletto
 Lönkytin
 Mustakari, Virpiniemi
 Mustakari, Martinniemi
 Nimetön
 Pensaskari
 Pulkkisenmatala (Haukipudas/Oulu)
 Puukkoletto
 Rapakari
 Rivinletto
 Satakarinletto
 Välikari
 Väliletto
 Ykskivi

Oulu municipality

Islands in the Oulu municipality include:

 Hermannit
 Hietasaari
 Kahvankari
 Korkiakari
 Laitakari
 Riitankari
 Runniletto
 Saapaskari
 Selkäkari
 Toppilansaari
 Vihreäsaari

Other Finnish islands

Other islands in the Finnish part of the bay include.

 Akio, Oulunsalo
 Haahka
 Hailuoto, Hailuoto
 Iso-Kraaseli, Raahe
 Kallankarit, Kalajoki
 Kammonkari, Oulunsalo
 Karinkannanmatala, Siikajoki
 Kello, Raahe
 Kengänkari, Hailuoto
 Kolmenkoivunkari, Oulunsalo
 Kotakari, Oulunsalo
 Kraaseli, Oulunsalo
 Kraaselinpauha, Lohtaja
 Kumpele, Raahe
 Lamunkari, Lumijoki
 Maluri, Haaparanta
 Ohtakari, 
 Parmiinit, Oulunsalo
 Puluvärkki, Raahe
 Rautakallio, Siikajoki
 Rokonkari, Lumijoki
 Sanskeri, Haaparanta
 Santosenkari, Hailuoto
 Seittenkaari, Haaparanta
 Tasku, Raahe
 Ulkolaidanmatala, Hailuoto
 Ulkopauha, Raahe
 Varjakansaari, Oulunsalo

Notes

References

Bothnian Bay
Bothnian

Bothnian Bay
Bothnian Bay
Bothnian